Bure Marshes National Nature Reserve (NNR) is maintained by English Nature in Norfolk, England, within The Broads National Park.

It is mostly fen land and includes four Broads which are disused peat workings dug between 900 and 1350:

Hoveton Great Broad managed by Natural England
Decoy Broad managed by Natural England
Ranworth Broad owned/managed by Norfolk Wildlife Trust
Cockshoot Broad owned/managed by Norfolk Wildlife Trust

This area of unreclaimed marshland supports many plants and animals, including rarities such as the crested buckler fern, rare moths and spiders, and some of Britain's rarest aquatic insects.

In open fens, reed, sedge and marsh hay are still harvested, mainly for the thatching industry.

National nature reserves in England
Norfolk Broads